Sir William Price (August 30, 1867 – October 2, 1924) was a Canadian businessman and politician.

Born in Talca, Chile, the son of Henry Ferrier Price and Florence Rogerson, Price was educated at Bishops College School in Lennoxville, Quebec and later at St. Marks School, Windsor, England. He was elected to the House of Commons of Canada for the electoral district of Quebec West in a 1908 by-election. A Conservative, he was defeated in the 1911 election.

He raised two companies for service during the Boer War. He was one of the organizers of the Valcartier Military Camp (now CFB Valcartier). It was for this work that he was knighted. During World War I, he served as a Lieutenant-Colonel of the 171st Battalion.

References
 Sir William Price at The Canadian Encyclopedia

See also 
List of Bishop's College School alumni

1867 births
1924 deaths
People from Talca
Canadian Knights Bachelor
Canadian Expeditionary Force officers
Bishop's College School alumni
Canadian military personnel of the Second Boer War
Conservative Party of Canada (1867–1942) MPs
Members of the House of Commons of Canada from Quebec
Persons of National Historic Significance (Canada)
Anglophone Quebec people